Subcutaneous granuloma annulare is a skin condition of unknown cause, most commonly affecting children, with girls affected twice as commonly as boys, characterized by skin lesions most often on the lower legs.

See also 
 Granuloma annulare
 Skin lesion
 List of cutaneous conditions

References

External links 

Monocyte- and macrophage-related cutaneous conditions